Lorraine Crosby (born 27 November 1960) is an English singer and songwriter. She was the female vocalist on Meat Loaf's 1993 hit single "I'd Do Anything for Love (But I Won't Do That)". Her debut album, Mrs Loud, was released in 2008.

Early life
Crosby was born in Walker, Newcastle upon Tyne. Her father died in a road accident when his car collided with a bus when she was two years old, leaving her mother to raise Lorraine, her two sisters and one brother. She attended Walker Comprehensive school. She sang in school and church choirs and played the violin in the orchestra, but did not start singing professionally until she was 20.

Work with Meat Loaf and Jim Steinman
Inspired by Tina Turner, Crosby searched the noticeboard for bands wanting singers at the guitar shop Rock City in Newcastle. After joining several bands she set up a five-piece cabaret band which toured extensively, playing to British and American servicemen throughout the early 1980s.

Back in Newcastle, she met Stuart Emerson, who was looking for a singer for his band. They began writing together, and also became a couple. In the early 1990s, Crosby sent songwriter and producer Jim Steinman some demos of songs she had written with Emerson. Steinman asked to meet them so they decided to move to New York. They then followed Steinman after he moved to Los Angeles. Steinman became their manager and secured them a contract with Meat Loaf's recording label MCA. While visiting the label's recording studios on Sunset Boulevard, Crosby was asked to provide guide vocals for Meat Loaf, who was recording the song "I'd Do Anything for Love (But I Won't Do That)". Cher, Melissa Etheridge and Bonnie Tyler were considered for the role. The song was a commercial success, becoming number one in 28 countries. However, as Crosby had recorded her part as guide vocals, she did not receive any payment for the recording but she receives royalties from PRS, and so the credit "Mrs. Loud" was used on the album. Also, Crosby did not appear in the Michael Bay-directed music video, where model Dana Patrick mimed her vocals. Meat Loaf promoted the single with American vocalist Patti Russo performing the live female vocals of this song at his promotional appearances and concerts. Crosby also sang additional and backing vocals on the songs "Life Is a Lemon and I Want My Money Back", "Objects in the Rear View Mirror May Appear Closer Than They Are", and "Everything Louder Than Everything Else" from the album Bat Out of Hell II: Back into Hell. On these three selections, she was credited under her real name rather than the alias of Mrs. Loud.

Solo work
Crosby regularly performed at holiday camps and social clubs in England until April 2005 when she took a break from live work.

In 2005, she sang a duet with Bonnie Tyler for the track "I'll Stand by You" from the album Wings. The song was written and composed by Stuart Emerson about Crosby's and Tyler's relationship. Also in 2005, Crosby appeared as a contestant on ITV's The X Factor. She performed "You've Got a Friend" and progressed to the second round after impressing judges Louis Walsh and Sharon Osbourne but Simon Cowell expressed doubt saying she "lacked star quality."

Crosby returned to live performances in April 2007. In November 2007, she appeared on the BBC Three television show Most Annoying Pop Songs We Hate to Love discussing the Meat Loaf track "I'd Do Anything for Love (But I Won't Do That)" which featured at No. 76.

In November 2008, Crosby appeared at Newcastle City Hall with special guest Bonnie Tyler to launch her self-produced album entitled Mrs Loud. The concert was later repeated in March 2011. In April 2009, she was also featured on The Justin Lee Collins Show and performed a duet with Justin, singing the Meat Loaf song "Dead Ringer for Love". She also performed "I'd Do Anything for Love" with Tim Healy for Sunday for Sammy in 2012.

Crosby performs in cabaret shows with her band along with her partner Stuart Emerson.

Crosby appeared in the first round of BBC's second series of The Voice on 6 April 2013. She failed to progress when she was rejected by all four coaches.

Other work
In the mid-1990s, Crosby appeared as an extra in several television series episodes.

In 2019, she joined Steve Steinman Productions in the show Steve Steinman's Anything for Love which toured the UK during 2019 and 2020, performing hits such as "Good Girls Go to Heaven", "Holding Out for a Hero" and dueting with Steinman on "What About Love" and "I'd Do Anything for Love", amongst others.

In 2020, she released a duet with Bonnie Tyler, "Through Thick and Thin (I'll Stand by You)" as a charity single in aid of the charity Teenage Cancer Trust.

Discography
Crosby has provided backing vocals on Bonnie Tyler's albums Free Spirit (1995) and Wings (2005).

Studio albums
 Mrs Loud (2008)

Singles
 "I'd Do Anything for Love (But I Won't Do That)" (with Meat Loaf) (1993)
 "Through Thick and Thin (I'll Stand by You)" (with Bonnie Tyler) (2020)

Other recordings
 "I'll Stand by You" (with Bonnie Tyler) (2005)
 "Double Take" (with Frankie Miller) (2018)

References

External links

 

1960 births
Living people
People from Newcastle upon Tyne (district)
Musicians from Tyne and Wear
The Voice UK contestants
21st-century English women singers
21st-century English singers